Clemmensen is a surname. Notable people with the surname include:

Andrew Clemmensen, member of Short Stack, an Australian rock band
Charlotte Clemmensen (born 1992), Danish curler
Ejgil Clemmensen (1890–1932), Danish rower who competed in the 1912 Summer Olympics
Erik Christian Clemmensen, (1876–1941), Danish-American chemist
Isabella Clemmensen (born 1996), Danish curler
Karen Clemmensen née Mundt (1917–2001), Danish architect and designer
Niels Clemmensen (1900–1950), Danish pianist and composer
Scott Clemmensen (born 1977), American professional ice hockey goaltender
Tove Clemmensen (1915–2006), Danish art historian and curator

See also
Clemmensen reduction, chemical reaction invented by Erik Christian Clemmensen
Clemens (disambiguation)
Clemmons, North Carolina
Clemons (disambiguation)
Clemson (disambiguation)
Klemens